Jean-Luc Deganis (born 10 March 1959) is a French basketball player. He competed in the men's tournament at the 1984 Summer Olympics.

References

1959 births
Living people
Basketball players at the 1984 Summer Olympics
French men's basketball players
Olympic basketball players of France
People from Moyeuvre-Grande
Sportspeople from Moselle (department)
1986 FIBA World Championship players
Stade Français basketball players